Swannanoa may refer to:

in New Zealand
Swannanoa, New Zealand, in North Canterbury, New Zealand

in the United States
Lake Swannanoa, New Jersey
Swannanoa, North Carolina
Swannanoa River, North Carolina
Swannanoa (mansion), Virginia, listed on the NRHP